Argyrochaetona is a genus of bristle flies in the family Tachinidae.

Species
 Argyrochaetona cubana Townsend, 1919
 Argyrochaetona peruana Townsend, 1928

References

Diptera of North America
Diptera of South America
Exoristinae
Brachycera genera
Taxa named by Charles Henry Tyler Townsend